The Ghastly Ones are a surf–garage rock band from Van Nuys, California with a late-night monster movie theme.

History
The Ghastly Ones were formed by two Special FX make up/movie monster makers, Garrett Immel aka Dr. Lehos and Norman Cabrera aka Baron Shivers.  They infused their love of Halloween records, late night monster movies and Screaming Lord Sutch with inspiration from early sixties surf and hot rod acts like The Lively Ones, Avengers VI, and The Del-Aires to create the first "spooky surf" band.

The band's first show was at Al's Bar on Halloween 1996, infamous in the punk world for several rowdy Misfits shows. During their early shows, the stage was often decorated with tombstones and cobwebs to give their performances the proper atmosphere.

Their unique sound and look caught the attention of Rob Zombie, who released their first album, A-Haunting We Will Go-Go in 1998 on his label Zombie-A-Go-Go Records, a subsidiary of Geffen Records.  Subsequent albums were released on their independent label, Ghastly Plastics Co.

In 2007, The Ghastly Ones toured the East Coast and Japan for the first time and in 2009 they played in Nottingham, England.  Their music has been featured in the SpongeBob SquarePants Halloween episode titled “Scaredy Pants” and the 2009 remake of Night of the Demons. 

Drummer and co-founder Norman "Baron Shivers" is currently focusing on his new band Boss Fink. Keyboardist Dave Klein "Captain Clegg" is currently playing drums with legendary surf/punk band Agent Orange and produces bands at Dave Klein Recording, his private studio in Los Angeles.

Selected discography

Albums
 A-Haunting We Will Go-Go, 1998
 All-Plastic Assembly Kit, 2005
 Target: Draculon, 2006
 Unearthed, 2007

EPs
 Dare To Go-Go Ghostly With The Ghastly Ones, 1998
 Gears n' Ghoulfinks, 2006, purple vinyl 7"

Singles
 "SpongeBob ScaredyPants," from SpongeBob SquarePants: Original Theme Highlights, 2001
 "Flying Saucers Over Van Nuys," 2006, green vinyl 7"

References

External links
 The Ghastly Ones - Official site

Surf music groups
Musical groups from Los Angeles
Musical groups established in 1996